Bernart Marti was a troubadour, composing poems and satires in Occitan, in the mid-twelfth century. They show that he was influenced by his contemporaries Marcabru and knew Peire d'Alvernha, who, in one poem, he accused of abandoning holy orders. Along with Peire, Gavaudan and Bernart de Venzac he is sometimes placed in a hypothetical Marcabrunian school. His work is "enigmatic, ironic, and satiric", but has no following among later troubadours, according to Gaunt and Kay.

Works
Nine or ten of Marti's poems survive; the following have been attributed to him:
A, senhors, qui so cuges 
Amar dei 
Belha m'es la flors d'aguilen
Bel m'es lai latz la fontana 
Companho, per companhia 
D'entier vers far ieu non pes 
Farai un vers ab son novelh 
Lancan lo douz temps s'esclaire 
Quan l'erb'es reverdezida 
Qant la pluei'eˑl vens eˑl tempiers

Bibliography
Gaunt, Simon, and Kay, Sarah. "Appendix I: Major Troubadours" (pp. 279–291). The Troubadours: An Introduction. Simon Gaunt and Sarah Kay, ed. Cambridge: Cambridge University Press, 1999. . 
Beggiato, Fabrizio. Il trovatore Bernart Marti. Modena, 1984.

External links 
Complete works on trobar.org

12th-century French troubadours